WPO may refer to:

Computing and math 
 Web performance optimization, in website optimization
 Well partial order, an ordering relation in mathematics
 Whole program optimization, a compiler optimization

Other uses 
 Weakly Pareto Optimal
 North Fork Valley Airport (IATA code), in the List of airports in Colorado, US
 Washington Post Company (former NYSE symbol)
 World Photography Organisation, for amateur and professional photographers

See also 
 WPO-3, 1941 plans for the defense of the Philippine Islands in the Battle of Bataan